Edward Dorsey (c. 1615 – 1659) was a boat-wright and  the patriarch of the Dorsey family of colonial Maryland. His name is also given as D'arcy.

Biography
It is unknown where Dorsey came from. Some have suggested County Cork, Ireland, but the best clue is perhaps the peculiar name of "Hockley in the Hole" for his sons' settlement, suggesting they were English.

He first arrived in Lower Norfolk County, Virginia about 1642, brought by Cornelius Lloyd, and settled on land called 'Shepbush'. By 1649 he moved to Maryland and settled on the Severn. He converted to Quakerism in 1658. He drowned off Kent Island in 1659.

Descendants 
Some 40 of his descendants fought in the Civil War for the Confederacy. For example Gus Dorsey was present when Jeb Stuart died. He also had descendants on the Union side. His descendant in the ninth generation, a different Augustus Dorsey, of Somerset County, Pennsylvania, was a sergeant in the 18th PA Cavalry, fought at Gettysburg, and survived nearly a year's captivity at Andersonville Prisoner of War camp. Another of his many descendants was Wallis Simpson, Duchess of Windsor, wife of King Edward VIII.

References

People of colonial Maryland
1610s births
1659 deaths
People from Anne Arundel County, Maryland
17th-century English people
Pre-statehood history of Maryland
American people of English descent
American Quakers
Dorsey family of Maryland